"Blinding Lights" is a song by Canadian singer the Weeknd. It was released on November 29, 2019, through XO and Republic Records, as the second single from his fourth studio album, After Hours (2020). The song was written and produced by the Weeknd alongside Swedish musicians Max Martin and Oscar Holter, with fellow Canadian musicians Belly and DaHeala receiving additional writing credits. The song was met with universal acclaim.

In the United States, "Blinding Lights" topped the Billboard Hot 100 for four weeks, and went on to set new records as the song with most weeks spent in the top 5 and top 10, as well as the first song to hold a spot in the top 10 on the chart for an entire year. It is the longest charting song by a solo artist on the Hot 100 of all time, spending 90 weeks on the chart. The song finished 2020 as the year's top Billboard Hot 100 song. The song also peaked at number one on the Canadian Hot 100, giving the Weeknd his fifth number-one hit on the chart. It topped the record charts in the United Kingdom and 36 other countries. On November 23, 2021, it was ranked as the greatest Hot 100 song in Billboard history. On December 31, 2022, the song overtook Ed Sheeran's "Shape of You" to become the most streamed song on Spotify.

"Blinding Lights" was the best-selling global single of 2020, earning 2.72 billion subscription stream equivalents globally, according to the International Federation of the Phonographic Industry (IFPI), making it the Weeknd's most successful single worldwide to date. Also, it was the 8th best-performing global single of 2021 with 1.61 billion subscription stream equivalents.

On Spotify, it was the most-streamed song of 2020 with nearly 1.6 billion streams, and is the most streamed song of all time on the platform. "Blinding Lights" has three official remixes: one by electronic band Chromatics, one by electronic dance music group Major Lazer, and one featuring singer-songwriter Rosalía.

Background and promotion
After a five-month social media hiatus, the singer-songwriter returned to Instagram on November 20, 2019, and posted six days later on November 26, 2019. He previously announced a project referred to as Chapter VI in June 2019. On November 24, 2019, a Mercedes-Benz commercial first aired on German TV featuring a clip of "Blinding Lights". It shows the Weeknd driving a Mercedes-Benz EQC SUV and asking the system to play his new song. The full-length version of the commercial premiered on November 29, alongside the single. In the days after, he took to social media to announce his return to music with the captions "the fall starts tomorrow night" and "Tonight we start a new brain melting psychotic chapter! Let's go!".

During an interview conducted by Jem Aswad from Variety magazine, the Weeknd discussed his experience working with Swedish songwriter-producer Max Martin, saying: "Max and I have become literally the best of friends, but I don't do that with many people. It's not that I can't, but a collaboration is a relationship, it's like a marriage, you've gotta build up to it." In a Billboard interview, the Weeknd expressed his appreciation for music of the 1980s: "I've always had an admiration for the era before I was born. You can hear it as far back as my first mixtape that the '80s — Siouxsie and the Banshees, Cocteau Twins — play such a huge role in my sound. Sometimes it helps me create a new sound and sometimes it's just obvious. I'm just glad the world's into it now."

Lyrics and composition
Throughout the song, the Weeknd sings about the rekindling of a relationship and the importance of his partner. The singer also mentions the city of Las Vegas, Nevada, where he refers to it by its nickname "Sin City" in the pre-chorus. The Weeknd gave a little insight into what his hit is about. "'Blinding Lights' [is about] how you want to see someone at night, and you're intoxicated, and you're driving to this person and you're just blinded by streetlights," he explains in the profile. "But nothing could stop you from trying to go see that person, because you're so lonely. I don't want to ever promote drunk driving, but that's what the dark undertone is."

The song is written in the key of F Dorian with a tempo of 171 beats per minute. The Weeknd's vocal range spans from the low note of F3 to the high note of C5. From its scale-laddering verses to its tension-filled chorus, the song exhibits the polish and "melodic math" for which Max Martin is renowned, according to Chris Molanphy from Slate. The Dorian structure provides a dreamy and euphoric nature to the song while still ultimately resolving to a minor chord. Exclusively in the music video, the song temporarily modulates to Eb Dorian as the beats per minute drops for 3 and a half measures.

Billboard staff writer Frank DiGiacomo assessed its qualities, "The opening drumbeat is a DeLorean back to Michael Jackson's 'Beat It'. The amphetamine synth conjures fond memories of leopard-print-era Rod Stewart's 'Young Turks' — or maybe that other guy with the avian hairdo, Mike Score from A Flock of Seagulls? And isn't that spooky B-movie organ from Rockwell's 'Somebody's Watching Me'? Abel Tesfaye's Drambuie-drenched vocals bathe you in euphoria as you bop around your home in an N-95 mask, punching your fist to the 'Hey!-Hey!-Hey!'s, making a magical and much-needed tonic for troubled times".

Audio engineer Şerban Ghenea says he loved working on the Weeknd's crisp-sounding "Blinding Lights". "It was crossing two worlds to make something new that fits today, sonically. The older folks like it because it's a throwback, and then the kids love it because it's a new thing that they never heard before."

Critical reception
"Blinding Lights" received universal acclaim from critics. It was named one of the best songs of 2020 by Billboard and the best song of 2020 by Consequence of Sound; the former highlighted its nostalgic appeal, and the latter praised its "melodic romance waxed over a blockbuster riff". Variety magazine named "Blinding Lights" the Record of the Year: "The Weeknd's 'Blinding Lights' is indisputably one of the landmark songs of 2020. The piece has a crystalline synth hook straight out of 1985. The record has come to symbolize strength and triumphing over adversity." "Blinding Lights" was named one of the best songs of 2019 by Stereogum, where editor Chris DeVille complimented the song's '80s aesthetic and vibe, saying that "the '80s will never die—or, at least, the glamorous neon '80s of our collective imagination".

Rolling Stone columnist Kory Grow named "Blinding Lights" one of the best songs of 2020: "With fuzzy synths and hopscotching drum-machine line, 'Blinding Lights' is the best new wave song this side of Duran Duran. In just three minutes, the Weeknd checks off any number of Eighties pop-song signposts—unanswered phone calls, driving fast just to feel something, lights representing loneliness—but the real magic is how his voice and the song's chiming keyboard line lingers in your head well after he injects new life into the greatest Eighties-steeped lyrical cliché of them all: 'I can't sleep until I feel your touch,'" and editor Jon Dolan praised the "europhile synth-pop-steeped" production, "Blinding Lights" evokes Depeche Mode and the Human League in its lonely-planet luster. David Smyth of Evening Standard also praised the song, calling it a "glorious blast of air punching Eighties synth-pop". Micah Peters from The Ringer selected it as one of the best on the album. The New York Times journalist Lindsay Zoladz named "Blinding Lights" one of the best songs of 2020: "It's a propulsive, modernized bit of '80s pastiche. It's always a blessing when the year's most overplayed pop song happens to be one you wouldn't mind hearing a billion and one times anyway," and editor Jon Caramanica added that "'Blinding Lights' is a sterling song that evokes both an idyllic future and triggers aural sense memories of mega-pop's glory years. 'Blinding Lights' could have been lifted from a found Jazzercise tape from 1986, though the chilly synths have a slightly sinister tinge [and] says a lot about the durability of the Weeknd's early noir—the full commitment to the louche aesthetic he embodied—that even the raging centrist popularity of 'Blinding Lights' can't disinter it."

Ben Beaumont-Thomas of The Guardian named "Blinding Lights" one of the best songs of 2020: "It's a titanic pop production from backroom genius Max Martin, who seems to pay homage to his fellow Scandinavians a-ha with the peppy gated drums. Abel Tesfaye himself shows he can slip between genres casually as he does the lovers in his songs, notching up another wedding disco classic." When describing the Weeknd's ode to '80s music, Nick Levine of BBC News named "Blinding Lights" one of the best songs of 2020: "Co-written and co-produced with Swedish songwriting genius Max Martin, its synth-pop shimmer manages to feel retro and contemporary at the same time—a tricky thing to pull off. Still, the key to its enduring popularity could lie in its ambiguity. Though 'Blinding Lights' explosive chorus is one of the year's most familiar and uplifting, there's a dash of darkness baked in that keeps things interesting." Editor Makael Wood from Los Angeles Times named "Blinding Lights" one of the best songs of 2020: "The Weeknd's throwback synth-pop smash was so ubiquitous this year that you couldn't avoid hearing it even when you weren't going anywhere. One aspect that kept it from wearing out its welcome: a crisp tempo just a few ticks faster than you're always expecting."

Year-end lists

Grammys controversy 
Despite having a successful year in 2020 with the critical and commercial success of "Blinding Lights" and its parent album, the Weeknd received zero nominations at the 63rd Annual Grammy Awards on November 24, 2020. The gesture spawned much controversy and was a shock to critics, fans, and Tesfaye himself. He responded via social media calling the Grammys "corrupt" in popular social media posts. Speculation arose that the announcement of his upcoming Super Bowl performance, as well as the confusion as to whether he should be nominated as pop or R&B, contributed to the snubs in all the categories that he was submitted to. Harvey Mason Jr., interim president of the Recording Academy, responded to the backlash by saying:

We understand that The Weeknd is disappointed at not being nominated. I was surprised and can empathize with what he's feeling. His music this year was excellent, and his contributions to the music community and broader world are worthy of everyone's admiration. We were thrilled when we found out he would be performing at the upcoming Super Bowl and we would have loved to have him also perform on the Grammy stage the weekend before. Unfortunately, every year, there are fewer nominations than the number of deserving artists. But as the only peer-voted music award, we will continue to recognize and celebrate excellence in music while shining a light on the many amazing artists that make up our global community. To be clear, voting in all categories ended well before The Weeknd's performance at the Super Bowl was announced, so in no way could it have affected the nomination process. All Grammy nominees are recognized by the voting body for their excellence, and we congratulate them all.

The Weeknd later made a statement addressing the infamous snub in January 2021, where he said that it felt like "an attack", saying "Look, I personally don't care anymore. I have three GRAMMYs (sic), which mean nothing to me now, obviously...It's not like, 'Oh, I want the GRAMMY!' It's just that this happened, and I'm down to get in front of the fire, as long as it never happens again. I suck at giving speeches anyways. Forget awards shows."

Accolades
{| class="wikitable plainrowheaders"
|+Awards for "Blinding Lights"
|-
! Year
! Awards
! Category
! Result
! 
|-
!scope="row" rowspan="26"| 2020
| rowspan="2" | American Music Awards
| Favorite Music Video
| 
| style="text-align:center;" rowspan="2"|
|-
| Favorite Song – Pop/Rock
| 
|-
| rowspan="2" | Camerimage International Film Festival
| Best Music Video
| 
| style="text-align:center;" rowspan="2"|
|-
| Best Cinematography in Music Video
| 
|-
| Danish Music Awards
| International Hit of the Year
| 
| style="text-align:center;"|
|-
|rowspan="2"| LOS40 Music Awards
| Best International Song
| 
| style="text-align:center;" rowspan="2"|
|-
| Best International Video
| 
|-
|rowspan="2"| MTV Europe Music Awards
| Best Song
| 
| style="text-align:center;" rowspan="2"|
|-
| Best Video
| 
|-
| MTV Millennial Awards Brasil
| Global Hit
| 
| style="text-align:center;" | 
|-
|rowspan="6"| MTV Video Music Awards
| Video of the Year
| 
| style="text-align:center;" rowspan="6"|
|-
| Best Cinematography
| 
|-
| Best Direction
| 
|-
| Best Editing
| 
|-
| Best R&B
| 
|-
| Song of Summer
| 
|-
| MTV Video Music Awards Japan
| Best Male Video – International
| 
| style="text-align:center;" | 
|-
| rowspan="2" | NRJ Music Award
| International Song of the Year
| 
| style="text-align:center;" rowspan="2"|
|-
| Video of the Year
| 
|-
| E! People's Choice Awards
| Music Video of the Year
| 
| style="text-align:center;"|
|-
| Rockbjörnen
| International Song of the Year
| 
| style="text-align:center;"|
|-
|rowspan="4"| UK Music Video Awards
| Best Pop Video – International
| 
| style="text-align:center;" rowspan="4"|
|-
| Best Cinematography in a Video
| 
|-
| Best Colour Grading in a Video
| 
|-
| Best Live Video
| 
|-
| Variety'''s Hitmakers
| Record of the Year
| 
| style="text-align:center;"|
|-
! scope="row" rowspan="21"| 2021
| ASCAP Pop Music Awards
| Award Winning Songs
| 
| style="text-align:center;"|
|-
| rowspan="5" |Billboard Music Awards
| Top Hot 100 Song
| 
| rowspan="5"  style="text-align:center;"|
|-
| Top Radio Song
| 
|-
| Top R&B Song
| 
|-
| Top Selling Song
| 
|-
| Top Streaming Song
| 
|-
| GAFFA Awards (Denmark)
| International Hit of the Year
| 
| style="text-align:center;"|
|-
| GAFFA Awards (Sweden)
| International Song of the Year
| 
| style="text-align:center;"|
|-
| rowspan="5" |iHeartRadio Music Awards
| Song of the Year
| 
| style="text-align:center;" rowspan="5"|
|-
| Titanium Song of the Year
| 
|-
| Best Music Video
| 
|-
| Best Lyrics
| 
|-
| TikTok Bop of the Year
| 
|-
| Juno Awards
| Single of the Year
| 
| style="text-align:center;"|
|-
| Kids' Choice Awards
| Best Song
| 
| style="text-align:center;"|
|-
| rowspan="2"| SOCAN Awards
| Pop Music Award
| 
| rowspan="2"  style="text-align:center;"|
|-
| International Song Award
| 
|-
| Swiss Music Awards
| Best International Hit
| 
| style="text-align:center;"|
|-
| TEC Awards
| Outstanding Creative Achievement – Record Production/Single or Track
| 
| style="text-align:center;"|
|}

Commercial performance
 North America 
"Blinding Lights" debuted at number 11 on the Billboard Hot 100 on the issue dated December 14, 2019, but fell 41 places to number 52 in its second week. In its 12th week on the chart, the song became the Weeknd's tenth top ten hit by rising to a new peak at number ten. On the issue dated March 28, 2020, the song rose two places to reach number two. The song reached number one on R&B/Hip-Hop Songs on April 4, 2020, leading for 11 non-consecutive weeks. The song also reached number one on R&B Songs chart on March 7, 2020, where it became his seventh number one on the chart, making him the artist with the most number ones on the chart's history and also attaining a record-breaking reign of 48 weeks. On March 30, 2020, the song rose to number one on the Billboard Hot 100, dethroning Roddy Ricch's "The Box" on the issue dated April 4, 2020. The single kept at its peak position the following week, becoming the Weeknd's third multi-week leader after "The Hills", which topped the chart five years earlier. "Blinding Lights" spent four weeks atop the Hot 100 and finished 2020 as the year's top Billboard Hot 100 song. The following year, it ranked at number three on the year-end chart, becoming the first single to finish in the top three on two occasions.

"Blinding Lights" spent 57 weeks in the top ten of the Billboard Hot 100 and 43 weeks in the top five, breaking the record for the most time logged in the region over the chart's 62-year history. On the Digital Song Sales chart, the song peaked at number one for the week of March 23, 2020, and became the Weeknd's fifth Digital Songs number one. The single reached a peak of number one on the Streaming Songs chart on March 30, becoming his first topper on the listing since "The Hills" led five years earlier. On April 13, the song reached number one on Pop Songs chart, where it led for 6 non-consecutive weeks, as it slid to number two on the Hot 100. It later rose back up to number one for the two following weeks. On May 18, the song became his first number one on the Adult Pop Songs chart, leading for 20 non-consecutive weeks. On November 7, "Blinding Lights" became his first number one on the Adult Contemporary chart, where it led for 35 non-consecutive weeks. "Blinding Lights" topped Radio Songs for a record-breaking 26 weeks, passing Goo Goo Dolls' "Iris", which held the record as the longest-running chart-topper for almost 22 years.
 "Blinding Lights" fell out of the Hot 100 for the week dated January 2, 2021, but it re-entered at number 3 the next week, breaking the three-way tie for the highest song to re-enter the Hot 100. Meanwhile, "Blinding Lights" tied for the most time totaled in the Hot 100's top three, 21 weeks, equaling the sums of The Chainsmokers' "Closer" and Mark Ronson's "Uptown Funk!".

For a short time during 2022, "Blinding Lights" was the longest running single in the history of the Hot 100 chart with a total of 90 weeks, surpassing Imagine Dragons' "Radioactive", which spent 87 weeks. In the process, the song also attained the longest chart run of any Hot 100 chart-topper in Billboard history, surpassing the 68-week run by LMFAO's "Party Rock Anthem" (2011–12). On April 5, 2022, "Blinding Lights" was awarded a Diamond certification from the Recording Industry Association of America (RIAA) for selling ten million units in the United States.

"Blinding Lights" also became producer Max Martin's 23rd Hot 100 number one single as a writer, 21st as producer, and his first in both credits since Justin Timberlake's "Can't Stop the Feeling!" (2016). Martin has the third-most as writer, behind Paul McCartney (32) and John Lennon (26), and the second-most as producer, behind George Martin (23). The Weeknd became the first artist to simultaneously lead Billboards five primary charts on March 30, topping the Hot 100, Billboard 200, Artist 100, Hot 100 Songwriters and Hot 100 Producers. The next week, he topped the Hot 100, Billboard 200 and Artist 100 once more, achieving the feat for a fourth time.

On the Rolling Stone Top 100 Songs chart, the song debuted at number two, where it was blocked from the top spot by the Weeknd's own "Heartless". The song also became the Weeknd's second entry on the chart. It later rose to number one on the chart following the release of After Hours.

In the singer's native Canada, "Blinding Lights" debuted at number two on the Canadian Hot 100, one place higher than "Heartless". It later managed to reach number one after the release of its parent album on the issue dated April 4, 2020, becoming the Weeknd's fifth number-one single in the country. It spent seven weeks atop the chart, tying "Starboy" as his longest-running chart-topper. In May 2021, "Blinding Lights" dropped off the Canadian Hot 100 after 75 weeks on the chart, leaving it one week short of the all-time record set by "I Gotta Feeling" by the Black Eyed Peas in 2010. For the first half of 2020, "Blinding Lights" was the top Canadian song overall, with 484,000 units. It has been certified Diamond by Music Canada for selling 800,000 units.

 Europe, Oceania and Latin America 
In the United Kingdom, "Blinding Lights" debuted at number 12 on the UK Singles Chart on December 6, 2019 – for the week ending date December 12, 2019. It eventually peaked at the top of the chart in February 2020, becoming the Weeknd's first number-one single in Britain. After two weeks at number one, it dropped a place number two. However it rebounded to number one the week after, and remained there for three consecutive weeks. The week after it fell a place to number two and also stayed at the runner-up spot for another week. The following week, it once again rebounded to number one, and stayed there for another three consecutive weeks. Overall, the single spent eight non-consecutive weeks atop the singles chart. It dropped to number two on April 24, 2020 – for the week ending April 30, 2020 – after the Weeknd used Twitter to ask people to support its close rival, a charity single, "You'll Never Walk Alone", by Michael Ball and Captain Sir Tom Moore, and make it number one for Moore's 100th birthday. As a result, "Blinding Lights" dropped a place to number two and remained at number two the following week, behind another charity single, "Times Like These". According to the Official Charts Company, "Blinding Lights" became Britain's biggest-selling song of 2020 with 2.2 million combined sales, including 250 million streams and 195,000 downloads. "Blinding Lights" has been certified 6× Platinum by the British Phonographic Industry for selling 3,600,000 units.

Elsewhere in Europe, the song topped the charts in Austria, Belgium, Croatia, Czech Republic, Denmark, Estonia, Finland, France, Germany, Greece, Italy, Latvia, Lithuania, Netherlands, Norway, Poland, Portugal, the Republic of Ireland, Serbia, Slovakia, Slovenia, Sweden, and Switzerland. It also peaked within the top ten of the charts in Belarus, Hungary, Malta, North Macedonia, Russia, Romania, Spain, and Ukraine.

In Australia, it topped the ARIA Charts for eleven non-consecutive weeks. It is the sixth longest-running number-one of all-time in the country, tied with songs such as Spice Girls's "Wannabe", Drake's "God's Plan" and Bryan Adams' "(Everything I Do) I Do It for You", as well the fifth longest by a foreign act. "Blinding Lights" has been certified 13× Platinum by the Australian Recording Industry Association for selling 910,000 units.

In New Zealand, the song topped the New Zealand Singles Chart for four non-consecutive weeks.

In Latin America, "Blinding Lights" topped the charts in Bolivia and Mexico. It also reached the top 10 in Chile, Costa Rica, Ecuador, El Salvador, Honduras, Panama, Puerto Rico and Uruguay, as well as the top 20 in Argentina, Nicaragua, Paraguay and Peru. It also charted in Brazil and Colombia, peaking at numbers 51 and 66 respectively.

Music video
Development
The music video for "Blinding Lights" was directed by Anton Tammi, assisted by Kenneth Taylor, and filmed in Fremont Street, Las Vegas and Downtown Los Angeles, during a four-day shooting that took place until 6 AM every day. It was produced by Sarah Parker and executive produced by Saskia Whinney for Somesuch, with production design by Adam William Wilson. Olliver Millar served as the director of photography, assisted by Devin "Daddy" Karringten on the second unit, Niels Lindelien on the steadicam operation, Nizzar Najm on the gaffer and Marlow Nunez on the key grip. The video was edited by Janne Vartia and Tim Montana, and included VFX by Mathematic, post production surpervision by Alec Ernest, color by Nicke Jacobsson, sound design by Akseli Soini, title design by Aleksi Tammi and 3D effects by Oscar Böckerman.

During the filming for the street scenes, the roads were not completely shut down, so random cars and pedestrians were passing by while the Weeknd danced in the street. Production was held up temporarily when somebody was arrested in the tunnel. The shooting required at least three vehicles driving through the nighttime streets. The Mercedes-AMG GT roadster was a specially equipped towed vehicle that allowed the Weeknd to act and lip-sync inside the moving convertible without needing to drive, and a chase SUV with a crane camera strapped to the top. Director of photography Oliver Millar said that he loves the music video format and talked about how intense it is to try and create iconic images during high-pressure shoots that don't last very long. He said that since the Weeknd's previous videos had a dark and gritty vibe, he used generators powering banks of LED lights and a Sony Venice full-frame digital motion picture camera system to try to re-create the look, ending up with the video's vintage, 1980s style.

 Release and synopsis 
On December 2, 2019, a commercial video containing footage from the Weeknd and Mercedes-Benz commercial, and the song's audio video, was released. The lyric video for "Blinding Lights" was released on December 6, 2019. Its official music video was released on January 21, 2020. A behind-the-scenes music video for the song was released on February 28, 2020. On May 5, 2020, a music video for the Chromatics remix of the song was released.

The video follows the After Hours videos sequence, starting where the "Heartless" premise ended, and presents the Weeknd as a lonely and psychotic guy walking and driving with no destination around the streets in Las Vegas, and a passing resemblance to jazz musician Herbie Hancock, circa 1978's Sunlight. The singer sports the same garb as the previous video, adopted for the album promotion, with a red suit, specific hairstyle, mustache and sunglasses. The visual opens with the Weeknd laughing as blood drips down his face, then jumps back in time to show the mayhem that led to his gruesome end — the pop star speeding around a deserted city, dancing gleefully in the streets. The visual follows the events of the music video for "Heartless" and sees the Weeknd go on a hallucinated joyride after waking from a trance. It concludes with the Weeknd having flashbacks to a club he attended earlier in the night, where he was serenaded by a mysterious woman, played by Japanese actress Miki Hamano and beat up by a duo of bouncers, uncredited, who had forced him to go on the run. The video depicts the singer amid a story inspired by the films Fear and Loathing in Las Vegas, Joker, and Casino.

 Reception 
Chase Ichiki from Revolt spoke highly of the music video, sharing that "the Weeknd crafts a world fans have eagerly waited for. Donning his staple red suit, he showcases his acting abilities in his latest video. Beginning with him hysterically laughing in a borderline psychotic way, then we see the Weeknd dance the pain away while wandering the city". Michael Cube from Nylon magazine wrote that "the video for "Blinding Lights" is appropriately cryptic for the famously elusive artist", and praised the presentation's alluring mystique. HITC columnist Christopher Weston assessed the film as "a burst of neon perfectly complimenting the gorgeous electronic sound. The 'Blinding Lights' visual accompaniment is one of the most stylish videos we've seen, packed with color, fast cars, nocturnal cityscapes and luxurious locations." Insider editor Callie Ahlgrim praised the visual, 'Blinding Lights' embodies everything that's made the Weeknd's newest era so successful. The video maintains his mysterious, slightly menacing aura — yet manages to create a cinematic, retro, exhilarating experience that's unlike anything he's done before". Bianca Gracie from Vulture named the music video one of the best of 2020: "It's a wild mix of Fear and Loathing in Las Vegas, Casino, and Joker that only Abel could pull off". USA Today editor Gary Dinges named the visual one of the best of 2020. The clip was nominated for six MTV Video Music Awards, and won two including Best R&B Video & Video of the Year. The visual was nominated for four UK Music Video Awards, and won Best Pop Video – International.

Live performances
The Weeknd performed "Blinding Lights" for the first time on December 6, 2019, during The Late Show with Stephen Colbert, a day after he performed "Heartless" on the same show. He brought a neon-lit cube with mirrored walls to the stage to sing through his brand new single. Filmed in black and white and from different perspectives on the stage, the Weeknd made the most of his mirror-cube before stepping outside of it to face the crowd. They sang the chorus of the track back to him, and some members of the audience raised mirrors of their own to flash The Weeknd's glow right back on him.

The song was performed on January 22, 2020, at Jimmy Kimmel Live!. The performance picked up right where the "Blinding Lights" visual left off, as the Weeknd remained in the red suit and his face was still bloodied with a bandage over his nose from the beatdown he vaguely remembered in the music video. He bounced around the stage for the lively performance, as thunderbolts and lightning strikes at his back filled the darkness in the venue. Appearing once again in a red suit, black gloves and bloody-faced with a bandage over his nose, he performed the single alongside "Scared to Live" on Saturday Night Live on March 7, 2020.

"Blinding Lights" received a special performance during The Weeknd Experience, an augmented reality, interactive livestream held on TikTok on August 7, 2020. It featured 3D visuals and several interactive components, including virtual back-up dancers appearing behind the Weeknd, who also traveled through hyperspace in a red convertible, surrounded by lasers in the virtual world. The Weeknd kicked off the 2020 MTV Video Music Awards with "Blinding Lights", described in advance as a "keyed-up, dazzling" showcase. He performed a rooftop version of his hit single from the observation deck at 30 Hudson Yards in Manhattan, New York City, complete with a background of fireworks.

The single was also performed live in the 2020 Time 100 primetime event and the Z100 Jingle Ball of 2020.

The Weeknd performed "Blinding Lights" as the closing track for the Super Bowl LV halftime show. On the field, he was surrounded by hundreds of the Weeknd-alike dancers. In the beginning, he moved with them in lock step. But as the song swelled, and the dancers began to swarm in odd patterns, the Weeknd moved in his own rhythm, holding the camera's gaze, alone amid the chaos.

Other versions
Remixes
The song's first official remix features vocals from Chromatics and is included in the original deluxe edition of After Hours and the remix EP After Hours (Remixes). A second official remix by Major Lazer was released on April 15, 2020. An unofficial remix by W&W was released on July 2, 2020. A third official remix with Rosalía was released on December 4, 2020.

Rosalía remix

A remix of the song featuring Spanish singer and songwriter Rosalía was released on December 4, 2020, six hours after its announcement to celebrate the first year since the release of the solo version of the song, which was named "the best-selling song of the year" by Billboard the day before. A lyric video featuring behind-the-scenes footage of the single's photoshoot was released the same day.

Starting from October, both artists started to comment on each other's social media posts. In November, some insiders reported that a "Save Your Tears" remix featuring the Spanish singer would be released on the 20th. This, however, never happened. However, on December 1, another insider reported that a duet version of "Blinding Lights" would be released on December 4. Both artists shared a picture of them on set a couple hours prior to the single's release without specifying the project.

Cover versions
YouTube metal cover artist, Leo Moracchioli, released a version in April 2020 playing all instruments and the vocals himself. On July 1, 2020, quintet vocalist group Pentatonix released a video for their rendition of "Blinding Lights." In the clip, the group is seen in their respective homes. On July 3, 2020, Christine and the Queens released his studio cover of "Blinding Lights". "[His] version is an emotive yet airy rendition. The artist's pillowy voice glides effortlessly no matter the heights", Consequence of Sound editor Lake Schatz stated. On August 21, 2020, Rainych Ran released a video for her rendition of "Blinding Lights" in Japanese version. Her Japanese version cover of "Blinding Lights" was earned praise by The Weeknd himself on his SNS. In September 2020, London Grammar covered "Blinding Lights" at the BBC Radio 1's Live Lounge, backed by piano and guitar players.

In January 2021 a bilingual (Welsh and Irish) version of Blinding Lights was released by Urdd Gobaith Cymru and TG Lurgan, 'Golau'n Dallu / Dallta ag na Soilse'. The project was hailed by First Minister of Wales Mark Drakeford as a "symbol of the cultural ties that bind Ireland and Wales". In November 2021, Canadian-American rock supergroup Saint Asonia released a Hard rock version of the song as a promotional single for their EP Introvert.

American rock band All Time Low released a pop punk cover on June 6, 2022.

In popular culture
The intro to "Blinding Lights" has been used in a TikTok choreographed dance challenge known as the "Blinding Lights Challenge". 
It was used to promote Super Bowl LV, and featured as the theme song for WrestleMania 36. "Blinding Lights" appears on the NBA 2K21 video game soundtrack. 
The song is featured on the dance rhythm game, Just Dance 2021.
The song was featured on Fortnites Joy Ride update via Fortnite Radio, as well as added as an icon series emote, complete with the original song.
Backstreet Boy AJ McLean and Cheryl Burke danced the jive to the song on the premiere of Dancing with the Stars.
 A remix of the song is played in the trailer for the 2022 Marvel Cinematic Universe (MCU) Disney+ series Ms. Marvel''. It is also used in the opening scene of its pilot episode, "Generation Why".
A Vietnamese singer named Jack-J97 has aroused controversy by allegedly plagiarizing from "Blinding Lights" with his latest song "Ngôi sao cô đơn". Jack's song and music video have the same style and "vibe" as The Weeknd's, although widely different in execution. The song was set to be released at 20:09 pm on July 19 (Vietnam time).

Personnel
Credits adapted from the Weeknd's official website and Tidal.

 The Weeknd – songwriting, vocals, production, programming, keyboards, bass, guitar, drums
 Belly – songwriting
 Jason Quenneville – songwriting
 Max Martin – songwriting, production, programming, keyboards, bass, guitar, drums
 Oscar Holter – songwriting, production, programming, keyboards, bass, guitar, drums
 Shin Kamiyama – engineering
 Cory Bice – engineering assistant
 Jeremy Lertola – engineering assistant
 Sean Klein – engineering assistant
 Şerban Ghenea – mixing
 John Hanes – engineering for mixing
 Dave Kutch – mastering
 Kevin Peterson – mastering

Charts

Weekly charts

Monthly charts

Year-end charts

All-time charts

Certifications

|-
!colspan="3"|Streaming
|-

Release history

See also 

 List of best-selling singles
 List of best-selling singles in Australia
 List of Billboard Hot 100 chart achievements and milestones
 List of airplay number-one hits in Argentina
 List of number-one singles of 2020 (Australia)
 List of number-one hits of 2020 (Austria)
 List of Ultratop 50 number-one singles of 2020
 List of Canadian Hot 100 number-one singles of 2020
 List of number-one hits of 2020 (Denmark)
 List of number-one singles of 2020 (Finland)
 List of number-one hits of 2020 (France)
 List of number-one hits of 2020 (Germany)
 List of number-one singles of 2020 (Ireland)
 List of number-one hits of 2020 (Italy)
 List of Dutch Top 40 number-one singles of 2020
 List of number-one singles from the 2020s (New Zealand)
 List of number-one songs in Norway
 List of number-one singles of 2020 (Poland)
 List of number-one singles of 2020 (Portugal)
 List of number-one songs of 2020 (Singapore)
 List of number-one singles of 2020 (Slovenia)
 List of number-one singles of the 2020s (Sweden)
 List of number-one hits of 2020 (Switzerland)
 List of UK Singles Chart number ones of the 2020s
 List of Billboard Hot 100 number-one singles of 2020
 List of Billboard Hot 100 top-ten singles in 2020
 List of Billboard Adult Contemporary number ones of 2020 
 List of Billboard Adult Contemporary number ones of 2021
 List of Billboard Adult Top 40 number-one songs of the 2020s
 List of Billboard Digital Song Sales number ones of 2020
 List of Billboard Mainstream Top 40 number-one songs of 2020
 List of Radio Songs number ones of the 2020s
 List of Billboard Streaming Songs number ones of 2020
 List of most-streamed songs on Spotify

Notes

References

External links
 
 
 
 
 
 
 
 
 
 
 
 
 
 
 
 
 
 
 
 
 
 
 
 
 
 
 
 

2019 singles
2019 songs
The Weeknd songs
Billboard Hot 100 number-one singles
Canadian Hot 100 number-one singles
Canadian synth-pop songs
Electropop songs
Dutch Top 40 number-one singles
Irish Singles Chart number-one singles
Juno Award for Single of the Year singles
MTV Video of the Year Award
Number-one singles in Australia
Number-one singles in Austria
Number-one singles in Denmark
Number-one singles in Finland
Number-one singles in France
Number-one singles in Germany
Number-one singles in Greece
Number-one singles in Israel
Number-one singles in Italy
Number-one singles in New Zealand
Number-one singles in Norway
Number-one singles in Poland
Number-one singles in Portugal
Number-one singles in Singapore
Number-one singles in Sweden
Number-one singles in Switzerland
Republic Records singles
Song recordings produced by Max Martin
Song recordings produced by the Weeknd
Songs about driving under the influence
Songs about Las Vegas
Songs about the United States
Songs written by Belly (rapper)
Songs written by DaHeala
Songs written by Max Martin
Songs written by Oscar Holter
Songs written by Rosalía
Songs written by the Weeknd
Synthwave songs
UK Singles Chart number-one singles
Ultratop 50 Singles (Flanders) number-one singles
Ultratop 50 Singles (Wallonia) number-one singles
XO (record label) singles